Chile competed at the 2011 Pan American Games in Guadalajara, Mexico from October 14 to 30, 2011.

Medalists

| width="78%" align="left" valign="top" |

|  style="text-align:left; width:22%; vertical-align:top;"|

Archery

Chile has qualified two male and three female archers.

Men

Women

Athletics

Men

Track and road events

Field events

Combined events

Women

Track and road events

Field events

Badminton

Chile has qualified three male and three female athletes in the individual and team competitions.

Men

Women

Mixed

Basque pelota

Chile has qualified two athletes each in the paleta rubber pairs trinkete, paleta leather pairs trinkete, paleta leather pairs leather 30m fronton, frontenis pairs 30m fronton, women's paleta rubber pairs trinkete, and women's frontenis pairs 30m fronton competitions.

Men

Women

Beach volleyball

Chile has qualified a men's pair and women's pair in the beach volleyball competitions.

Bowling

Chile has qualified two female bowlers to compete in the individual and team competitions.

Women
Individual

Pairs

Boxing

Chile has qualified one boxer in the 69 kg men's category.

Men

Canoeing

Chile has qualified two boats in the C-1 200 and the C-1 1000 competitions.

Men

Women

Cycling

Road Cycling

Men

Women

Track Cycling

Sprints & Pursuit

Keirin

Omnium

Mountain Biking

Men

Women

BMX

Diving

Men

Women

Equestrian

Dressage

Eventing
{|class="wikitable" border="1" style="font-size:90%"
|-
!rowspan=3|Athlete
!rowspan=3|Horse
!rowspan=3|Event
!colspan=2 rowspan=2|Dressage
!colspan=2 rowspan=2|Cross-country
!colspan=4|Jumping
!colspan=2 rowspan=2|Total
|-
!colspan=2|Qualifier
!colspan=2|Final
|-
!Penalties
!Rank
!Penalties
!Rank
!Penalties
!Rank
!Penalties
!Rank
!Penalties
!Rank
|-
|Felipe Martinez
|Navideño
|Individual
|align=center|56.30
|align=center|16
|align=center colspan=2|EL
|align=center colspan="8"|Did not advance
|-
|Jose Ibañez
|Amil Fuego
|Individual
|align=center|56.50
|align=center|17
|align=center colspan=2|EL
|align=center colspan="8"|Did not advance
|-
|Sergio Iturriaga
|Lago Rupanco
|Individual
|align=center|59.60
|align=center|25''
|align=center|12.40
|align=center|17|align=center|4.00
|align=center|15|align=center|0.00
|align=center|11|align=center|76.00
|align=center|11°|-
|Carlos Lobos
|Ranco
|Individual
|align=center|59.80
|align=center|26|align=center|12.80
|align=center|19|align=center|0.00
|align=center|13|align=center|0.00
|align=center|10|align=center|72.60
|align=center|10°|-
|Ricardo Stangher
|Halesco
|Individual
|align=center|62.60
|align=center|30|align=center colspan=2|EL|align=center colspan="8"|Did not advance
|-
|Felipe MartinezJose IbañezSergio IturriagaCarlos LobosRicardo Stangher
|NavideñoAmil FuegoLago RupancoRancoHalesco
|Team
|align=center|172.40
|align=center|4|align=center|972.20
|align=center|7|align=center|4.00
|align=center|6|align=center colspan=2 bgcolor=wheat|
|align=center|1148.60
|align=center|6°|}

Individual jumping

Team jumping

 Fencing

Chile has qualified men's and women's teams in the épée and foil competitions and a men's team in the sabre competitions.

Men

Women

 Field hockey

Chile has qualified a men's and women's field hockey team.

Men

Team

Mathias Anwandter
Alexis Berczely
Fernando Binder
Andres Fuenzalida
Raul Garces
Adrian Henriquez
Thomas Kannegiesser
Sebastian Kapsch
Esteban Krainz
Kan Richter
Sven Richter
Juan Cristóbal Rodríguez
Martin Rodriguez
Raimundo Valenzuela
Jaime Zarhi
Jose ZirpelStandingsResultsSemi-finalsBronze medal matchWomen

Team

Catalina Cabach
Camila Caram
Daniela Caram
Maria Fernandez
Christine Fingerhuth
Carolina Garcia
Daniela Infante
Denise Infante
Paula Infante
Jodefina Khamis
Claudia Schuler
Catalina Thiermann
Manuela Urroz
Javiera Villagra
Sofia Walbaum
Michelle WilsonStandingsResultsSemi-finalsBronze medal match Football

Chile has qualified a women's team in the football competition.WomenSquad

Yanara Aedo
Yorky Arriagada
Natalia Campos
Nicole Cornejo
Claudia Endler
Daniela Fuenzalida
Su Helen Galaz
Javiera Guajardo
Carla Guerrero
Yessenia Huenteo
Francisca Lara
Francisca Mardones
Adriana Moya
Tatiana Perez
Maria Rojas
Camila Sáez
Rocio Soto
Daniela Zamora

StandingsResultsGymnastics

 Artistic
Chile has qualified two male and female athletes in the artistic gymnastics competition.

Men

Individual qualification & Team Finals

Individual Finals

Women
Individual qualification & Team Finals

Individual Finals

 Rhythmic
Chile has qualified one athlete in the individual rhythmic gymnastics competition.IndividualAll Around

 Handball

Chile has qualified a men's team and a women's teamMenTeam

Guillermo Araya
Felipe Barrientos
Rodolfo Cornejo
Rodrigo Diaz
Emil Feuchtmann
Erwin Feuchtmann
Harald Feuchtmann
Nicolas Jofre
Patricio Martinez
Felipe Maurin
Rene Oliva
Marco Oneto
Esteban Salinas
Rodrigo Salinas
Alfredo ValenzuelaStandingsResultsSemifinals

Bronze medal matchWomenTeam

Gisele Angel
Paula Cajas
Daniela Canessa
Daniela Ceza
Andrea Cisterna
Inga Feuchtmann
Pamela Flores
Valeria Flores
Maria Letelier
Daniela Mino
Maria Musalem
Carla Sciaraffia
Alicia Torres
Elba Torres
Pamela VeraStandingsResultsFifth-eighth place matches

Fifth place match

 Judo

Chile has qualified four athletes in the 66 kg, 73 kg, 81 kg, and 90 kg men's categories and two athletes in the 48 kg and 57 kg women's categories.

Men

Repechage Rounds

Women

Repechage Rounds

 Karate

Chile has qualified two athletes in the 60 kg and 75 kg men's categories and four athletes in the 50 kg, 55 kg, 68 kg, and 68+kg women's categories.

 Modern pentathlon

Chile has qualified two male and one woman pentathlete.

MenWomenRacquetball

Women

Roller skating

Chile has qualified two male and two female athletes in the roller skating competitions.

Men

Artistic

Women

Artistic

RowingMen Rugby sevens

Chile has qualified a team to participate in rugby sevens. It will consist of 12 athletes.

Team

Jose Barturen
Oliver Bassa
Felipe Brangier
Aldo Cornejo
German Herrera
Francisco Hurtado
Tomas Ianiszeswcki
Francisco Metuaze
Juan Pablo Metuaze
Benjamin Omegna
Alfonso Rioja
Ignacio Silva

Quarterfinals

Fifth to Eighth place

Fifth place match

Sailing

Chile has qualified five boats and eleven athletes in five sailing competitions.

Men

Women

Open

ShootingMenWomen Squash

Chile has qualified three male and three female athletes in the individual and team competitions.

Men

Women

Swimming

Men

Women

 Table tennis

Chile has qualified three male and three female athletes in the individual and team competitions.

Men

Women

Taekwondo

Chile has qualified two athletes in the 68 kg and 80 kg men's categories and two athletes in the 57 kg and 67 kg women's categories.MenWomen'''

Tennis

Men

Women

Mixed doubles

Triathlon

Men

Women

Water skiing

Chile has qualified a full team in the water skiing competition.

Men

Women

Weightlifting

Wrestling

Men
Freestyle

References

Nations at the 2011 Pan American Games
P
2011